A Night in Venice  is a 1934 German-Hungarian operetta film directed by Robert Wiene and starring Tino Pattiera, Tina Eilers and Ludwig Stössel. It is loosely based on the 1883 operetta Eine Nacht in Venedig by Johann Strauss II.

It was made at the Hunnia Studios in Budapest with three weeks of location shooting in Venice. In common with the practice of multi-language versions at the time, the film was also made in a separate Hungarian language version Egy éj Velencében based on the same screenplay. The Hunnia Studios specialised in such co-productions during the era. The two versions were shot simultaneously. The Hungarian version was co-directed by Wiene and Géza von Cziffra and used a separate cast of Hungarian actors.

The film appears to have been popular with Austrian and German audiences, although its critical reception was less enthusiastic.

Cast
 Tino Pattiera
 Tina Eilers
 Ludwig Stössel
 Oskar Sima
 Lici Balla
 Fritz Fischer

References

Bibliography

External links

1934 films
1930s romantic musical films
German romantic musical films
Hungarian musical films
Hungarian romance films
1930s German-language films
Films directed by Robert Wiene
Films set in Venice
Operetta films
Films based on operettas
German black-and-white films
1930s German films